The siege of Perpignan was a siege during the Catalan Revolt.

History
The troops of Louis XIII of France besieged Perpignan from November 4, 1641 onward. The King himself was present during spring 1642, but left before the conquest of the city. Two Spanish attempts to relieve the city failed: on land in the Battle of Montmeló on March 28 and at sea in the Battle of Barcelona in July. The governor, the Marquis de Flores Dávila, was forced to surrender the city on September 9, 1642, because of the large number of casualties by hunger and the fall of Cotlliure. The city was occupied by French troops supported by the Catalan rebels. There were only 500 Spanish survivors.

Consequences 
After the fall of Perpignan, the Fort de Salses remained completely isolated without any hope of relief, and therefore also surrendered. The whole of the Roussillon had fallen into French hands and remained French until today because of the Treaty of the Pyrenees in 1659.

Sources 

Perpignan
Perpignan
Perpignan
Perpignan
1641 in France
1642 in France
1641 in Spain
1642 in Spain
Conflicts in 1641
Conflicts in 1642